Claire Lehmann (née Jensen; born 1985) is an Australian journalist and the founding editor of Quillette.

Personal life
Born 18 July 1985, Lehmann is the daughter of a former teacher and a speech pathologist who was raised in Adelaide, South Australia. She graduated with a bachelor's degree in psychology and English from the University of Adelaide with first-class honours in 2010. Lehmann was then a graduate student in psychology, but dropped out after having a child. She is married and has two children. She is the daughter-in-law of the poet Geoffrey Lehmann.

Career
Lehmann founded the online magazine Quillette in October 2015. According to the newspaper The Australian, Lehmann's story about the controversy surrounding Google engineer James Damore precipitated the venture's success.

Lehmann has contributed to publications including The Guardian, Scientific American, Tablet, and ABC News.

Bari Weiss regards Lehmann as one of the leaders of the so-called "intellectual dark web". Lehmann is seen as part of the intellectual dark web (IDW) due to publishing Quillette which Politico has referred to as "the unofficial digest of the IDW" which "prides itself on publishing 'dangerous' ideas other outlets won't touch," and critiquing "what they see as left-wing orthodoxy."

The Sydney Morning Herald named Lehmann in their "Ten Aussies who shook the world in tech and media in 2018" citing that her online magazine, Quillette, has "attracted as many as 2 million followers a month, [and] is starting to gain significant traction in tech and libertarian circles in the US".

References

External links

 
 

1985 births
Living people
21st-century Australian journalists
Australian magazine editors
Australian women journalists
Journalists from South Australia
Journalists from Sydney
University of Adelaide alumni
Women magazine editors
Writers from Adelaide
Writers from Sydney